KCNB (94.7 FM, B94.7) is a radio station broadcasting a Top 40 music format. Licensed to Chadron, Nebraska, United States. The station is currently owned by Eagle Communications.

References

External links
 

CNB
Chadron, Nebraska